The 2015 Eliteserien promotion/relegation play-offs was the 42nd time a spot in the Norwegian top flight was decided by play-off matches between top tier and second level clubs.

At the end of the 2015 season, Mjøndalen and Sandefjord Fotball were relegated directly to 2016 OBOS-ligaen, and was replaced by Sogndal and SK Brann who were directly promoted.

Background
The play-offs between Eliteserien and 1. divisjon have been held every year since 1972 with exceptions in 1994 and 2011. They take place for the two divisions following the conclusion of the regular season and are contested by the fourteenth-placed club in Eliteserien and the four clubs finishing below the automatic promotion places in 1. divisjon. The fixtures are determined by final league position – the first to knockout-rounds begins with the four teams in the OBOS-ligaen: 3rd v 6th and 4th v 5th, and the winner then play each other to determine who meet the Eliteserien club in the final.

Qualified teams
Five teams entered a play-off for the last Eliteserien spot for the 2016 season. These were:
 Start (14th placed team in the Tippeligaen)
 Kristiansund (third placed team in the OBOS-ligaen)
 Hødd (fourth placed team in the OBOS-ligaen)
 Jerv (fifth placed team in the OBOS-ligaen)
 Ranheim (sixth placed team in the OBOS-ligaen)

The four OBOS-ligaen teams first played a single game knockout tournament, with the winner (Jerv) advancing to a two-legged tie against the Eliteserien team (Start) for the 16th and final spot in the 2016 Eliteserien season. Start maintained their position in the top flight with a 4–2 win on aggregate against Jerv.

Matches
The third to sixth-placed teams in 2015 1. divisjon took part in the promotion play-offs; these were single leg knockout matches, two semi-finals and a final. The winners of the second round, Jerv, advanced to play the 14th placed team in Tippeligaen over two legs in the Eliteserien play-offs for a spot in the top-flight next season.

First round

1–1 on aggregate. Jerv won 6–5 on penalties.

Second round

Final
The 14th-placed team, Start, took part in a two-legged play-off against Jerv, the winners of the 2015 First Division promotion play-offs, to decide who would play in the 2016 Tippeligaen.

Start won 4–2 on aggregate and retained their place in the 2016 Tippeligaen; Jerv remained in the First Division.

Bracket

Eliteserien play-offs
2015 in Norwegian football